Scott Brooker is a British puppeteer, puppet maker, puppet designer.

Career
Scott Brooker has many television, theatre and film credits as a puppet maker and puppeteer. One of his most well known work was for Spitting Image, where he spent thirteen years as head puppet maker. After leaving Spitting Image, Brooker worked with Jim Henson's Creature Shop as a designer and fabricator working on many of their productions, including Alice in Wonderland and Five Children and It. At the Creature Shop  Brooker also helped design the Monkey from PG and for Disney Channel's The Raoul Show. Brooker has also designed many theatre productions, most notably David Wood's Guess How Much I Love You. and A Christmas Carol. As well as making puppets for commercials, films, television and theatre, Brooker also designed the lamb puppet to promote CLIC Sargent, a children cancer on charity.  Brooker has also performed additional puppetry for the character of Rattus Rattus from Horrible Histories. Brooker assisted John Eccleston (Rattus' main operator) in operating Rattus for all episodes of Gory Games, a Horrible Histories game show spin off. Brooker is currently part of "Puppet Shack", a small organisation of puppet professionals (including Nigel Plaskitt, Guy Stevens, Paul Jomain and Jonathan Saville), who have worked for many TV, film and theatre productions. He has also made puppets for the BBC programme That Puppet Game Show and recently designed puppets and creatures for The Harry Hill Movie.

Filmography
Spitting Image
The Harry Hill Movie
That Puppet Game Show
Peter and the Wolf: A Prokofiev Fantasy
Alice in Wonderland
Five Children and It
Round the Bend
Hi Five
The Hitchhiker's Guide to the Galaxy
Gory Games
Horrible Histories
Five Minutes More
The Raoul Show
The Winjin Pom
Get Fresh
Spitting Image Election Special
The Man With No Title

Theatre credits
A Christmas Carol
Guess How Much I Love You
Treasure Island
Dragon
Doctor Dolittle
Peter Pan
The Three Musketeers
Cinderella
Dick Whittington
Mother Goose
Aladdin
MOJO

References

External links
 Scott Brooker at the Internet Movie Database
 Puppet Shack Official Website

British puppeteers
Puppet designers
Year of birth missing (living people)
Living people